The Jeomgog Formation is an Early Cretaceous (Albian) geologic formation of the Hayang Group in the Gyeongsang Basin of South Korea.

Fossil content 
Fossil theropod tracks have been reported from the formation.

See also 
 List of dinosaur-bearing rock formations
 List of stratigraphic units with theropod tracks
 Geoncheonri Formation
 Gugyedong Formation
 Haman Formation
 Hasandong Formation
 Jinju Formation

References

Bibliography 

  
 
   

Geologic formations of South Korea
Lower Cretaceous Series of Asia
Cretaceous South Korea
Albian Stage
Ichnofossiliferous formations
Paleontology in South Korea